The False Imprisonment Act is an act passed by the Parliament of Ireland in 1410, during the reign of Henry IV as Lord of Ireland.
The act covered false imprisonment.

References

1410s in law
Acts of the Parliament of Ireland (pre-1801)
1410 in Ireland
15th century in Ireland